In mathematics, a superior highly composite number is a natural number which has the highest ratio of its number of divisors to some positive power of itself than any other number. It is a stronger restriction than that of a highly composite number, which is defined as having more divisors than any smaller positive integer.

The first 10 superior highly composite numbers and their factorization are listed.

For a superior highly composite number n there exists a positive real number ε such that for all natural numbers k smaller than n we have

and for all natural numbers k larger than n we have

where d(n), the divisor function, denotes the number of divisors of n.  The term was coined by Ramanujan (1915).

For example, the number with the most divisors per square root of the number itself is 12; this can be demonstrated using some highly composites near 12.

120 is another superior highly composite number because it has the highest ratio of divisors to itself raised to the .4 power.

The first 15 superior highly composite numbers, 2, 6, 12, 60, 120, 360, 2520, 5040, 55440, 720720, 1441440, 4324320, 21621600, 367567200, 6983776800  are also the first 15 colossally abundant numbers, which meet a similar condition based on the sum-of-divisors function rather than the number of divisors. Neither set, however, is a subset of the other.

Properties 

All superior highly composite numbers are highly composite. This is easy to prove: if there is some number k that has the same number of divisors as n but is less than n itself (i.e. , but ), then  for all positive ε, so if a number "n" is not highly composite, it cannot be superior highly composite.

An effective construction of the set of all superior highly composite numbers is given by the following monotonic mapping from the positive real numbers. Let

for any prime number p and positive real x. Then
 is a superior highly composite number.

Note that the product need not be computed indefinitely, because if  then , so the product to calculate  can be terminated once .

Moreover, for each superior highly composite number  exists a half-open interval  such that .

This representation implies that there exist an infinite sequence of  such that for the n-th superior highly composite number  holds

The first  are 2, 3, 2, 5, 2, 3, 7, ... .  In other words, the quotient of two successive superior highly composite numbers is a prime number.

Superior highly composite radices 
The first few superior highly composite numbers have often been used as radices, due to their high divisibility for their size. For example:
 Binary (base 2)
 Senary (base 6)
 Duodecimal (base 12)
 Sexagesimal (base 60)

Bigger SHCNs can be used in other ways. 120 appears as the long hundred, while 360 appears as the number of degrees in a circle.

Notes

References 
   Reprinted in Collected Papers (Ed. G. H. Hardy et al.), New York: Chelsea, pp. 78–129, 1962

External links
 

Integer sequences